Rummies is a 1989 novel by American author Peter Benchley. It features an ensemble cast of characters who meet and interact at a drug rehabilitation clinic. The main character, the "WASP-ish" Scott Preston, has a debilitating alcohol addiction, and sees his wife and boss stage an intervention, sending him to a clinic in New Mexico. It has been likened to Ken Kesey's One Flew Over the Cuckoo's Nest.

References

1989 American novels
Novels about alcoholism
Novels about drugs
Novels set in New Mexico